Mackenzie Brooke Smith (born February 6, 2001) is an American actress, most notable for her recurring role on Terminator: The Sarah Connor Chronicles as Savannah, the daughter of Catherine Weaver. She also appeared in the 2016 motion picture The Family Fang, alongside Kathryn Hahn and Jason Bateman. Smith can also be seen guest starring in television series like Grey's Anatomy, 100 Things to Do Before High School, Desperate Housewives and The Middle.

Career
Best known for her recurring role in Terminator: The Sarah Connor Chronicles as Savannah Weaver, the daughter of Catherine Weaver and Lachlan Weaver.
Early in her career, Smith could be seen in The Passenger as Claire Currie. She had a small role in Road to the Altar as Brooke, a girl who plays with her sister in a hair and makeup shop. Smith also had a small part in Pushing Daisies as the younger Lily Charles in the episode "Kerplunk". In 2010, Smith was also seen in two episodes of Desperate Housewives as Rachel Miller. She was also seen in The Middle as Megan, a young girl that goes to school with Brick Heck.
In recent years she has appeared as supporting characters in films such as A Winter Rose, The Family Fang which was directed by Jason Bateman, and the thriller anthology Phobias where she acted alongside Lauren Miller Rogen. Her most notable work in television as a teenager and adult include the reoccurring role of Martha in 100 Things to Do Before High School, and the Guest Star role Ella Nelstadt in Grey's Anatomy''.

Filmography

Film

Television

Music videos

Awards

References

External links

2001 births
21st-century American actresses
American child actresses
American film actresses
American television actresses
Place of birth missing (living people)
Living people